George Lambert VC (16 December 1819 – 10 February 1860), born in Markethill, County Armagh, was an Irish recipient of the Victoria Cross, the highest and most prestigious award for gallantry in the face of the enemy that can be awarded to British and Commonwealth forces.

He was 37 years old, and a Sergeant-Major in the 84th Regiment of Foot (later the 2nd Battalion, York and Lancaster Regiment), British Army during the Indian Mutiny when the following deeds took place at Onao, Bithoor and Lucknow for which he was awarded the VC:

He later achieved the rank of lieutenant. He died in Sheffield on 10 February 1860 and was buried at Wardsend Cemetery in the city.

His Victoria Cross is displayed at The York and Lancaster Regiment Museum, Rotherham, South Yorkshire.

References

Listed in order of publication year 
The Register of the Victoria Cross (1981, 1988 and 1997)

Ireland's VCs  (Dept of Economic Development, 1995)
Monuments to Courage (David Harvey, 1999)
Irish Winners of the Victoria Cross (Richard Doherty & David Truesdale, 2000)

External links
Location of grave and VC medal (South Yorkshire)

1819 births
1860 deaths
19th-century Irish people
Irish officers in the British Army
Irish recipients of the Victoria Cross
People from County Armagh
84th Regiment of Foot officers
Indian Rebellion of 1857 recipients of the Victoria Cross
British Army recipients of the Victoria Cross
Military personnel from County Armagh